The G7es (T5) "Zaunkönig" ("wren") was a passive acoustic torpedo employed by German U-boats during World War II. It was called the GNAT (German Navy Acoustic Torpedo) by the British.

Description 

The forerunner of the Zaunkönig was the G7e/T4 Falke, codename "Falcon," which was introduced in March 1943, but saw limited use for trial and was rapidly phased out of service in favor of the later model that received a number of significant enhancements. It was faster, had more range, possessed a magnetic or contact detonator and could be equipped with a percussion pistol.

The T5 torpedo was capable of travelling at 24 knots (44 km/h) and had an effective range of about 5000 metres against convoy escorts vessels proceeding at speeds between 10 (18 km/h) and 18 knots (33 km/h). The homing system consisted of two hydrophone receivers and altered the direction of the rudder via an electropneumatic device. The acoustic homing torpedo was specifically designed as to be attracted by the pitch of an escort's propellers and would — even if aimed inaccurately — explode under the ship's stern.

There were three variants:
 Two flat-nosed versions which contained four sets of magnetostriction hydrophones.
 A round-nosed version which contained two magnetostriction hydrophones inside a funnel-shaped baffle.

Use 
The detection range of the hydrophones varied much according to circumstance, but 450 m (500 yards) was considered reasonable for a ship moving at 15 knots.

The first 80 T5s were delivered on 1 August 1943, and the weapon was first used in a large-scale maneuver against the North Atlantic convoys ONS 18/ON 202 in late September 1943. The commanders reported a number of torpedo strikes and recorded the sinking of nine commercial steamers and 12 escort ships after the battle. In fact, only six merchant ships and three escort vessels, a destroyer, a frigate and a corvette were sunk. However, despite some initial success, in particular sinking destroyers and corvettes, the Zaunkönigs effectiveness was quickly nullified by the introduction of a decoy known as Foxer noise maker. The NDRC worked on countermeasures to an acoustic torpedo long before its introduction by the Germans. At the end of September 1943, it was promptly installed on all transatlantic escort vessels.

Grossadmiral Dönitz, not satisfied with the development of countermeasures, realized that his brief success against the North Atlantic trade convoys was only a flare up and recorded: 

In spite of highly effective Allied countermeasures, a total of over 700 T5s were fired in combat, sinking 77 ships.

See also
 G7e torpedo
 List of World War II torpedoes of Germany

Footnotes

References

External links

More indepth details of G7es (TV) Acoustic Homing Torpedo at uboataces.com

World War II torpedoes of Germany

ja:G7 (魚雷)#G7es (TV)